Reissella is a genus of benthic forams with a test of microgranular calcite from the upper Cretaceous (Cenomanian) of Israel. The test starts off planispirally enrolled and involute but later may tend to uncoil and flare with as many as ten chambers in the final whorl. The interior as with other spirocyclinids is complex. Other Late Cretaceous spirocyclinids include Qataria, and Sornayina

References 

Loftusiida
Prehistoric Foraminifera genera